Léandre Thibault (9 June 1899 – 19 December 1971) was a Canadian automobile dealer, building contractor and industrialist. He served as a Liberal party member of the House of Commons of Canada. He was born in Baie-des-Sables, Quebec.

He was first elected at the Matapédia—Matane riding in the 1953 general election and re-elected for a second term in 1957. After completing that term, the 23rd Canadian Parliament, Thibault left federal office and did not seek re-election in 1958.

Thibault was also a Mayor of Matane, Quebec. He died prior to September 1989.

References

External links
 

1899 births
1971 deaths
Members of the House of Commons of Canada from Quebec
Liberal Party of Canada MPs
Mayors of places in Quebec